The 2023 Southern Miss Golden Eagles football team will represent the University of Southern Mississippi as a member of the Sun Belt Conference during the 2023 NCAA Division I FBS football season. They are led by head coach Will Hall, who is coaching his third season with the team. The Golden Eagles will play their home games at M. M. Roberts Stadium in Hattiesburg, Mississippi.

Previous season

The Golden Eagles finished the 2022 season 7–6, 4–4 in Sun Belt play to finish in third place in the West Division. They beat Rice 38-24 in the LendingTree Bowl.

Schedule
The football schedule was announced February 24, 2023.

References

Southern Miss
Southern Miss Golden Eagles football seasons
Southern Miss Golden Eagles football